The Lakeview Formation is a geologic formation in Idaho. It preserves fossils dating back to the Cambrian period.

See also

 List of fossiliferous stratigraphic units in Idaho
 Paleontology in Idaho

References
 

Cambrian Idaho
Cambrian southern paleotropical deposits